Archibald George Forman CBE (1910-1967) was a British naval officer who became the first Chief of Naval Staff of the Ghana Navy.

Ghana Navy service
Forman was born in Brentford on 20 June 1910. An acting sub-lieutenant in the Royal Navy aged 17, he became a sub-lieutenant in 1931, and lieutenant in 1933. He became Lieutenant Commander at the start of 1941, at this time he commanded HMS Airdale and HMS Lookout (G32), was mentioned in dispatches in 1942, and became a Commander at the close of 1943, at this time he commanded HMS Garth (L20). In 1950 he was made Commodore. Retiring from active Navy service in July 1959, he was seconded to the newly created Ghana Navy. Kwame Nkrumah, then the Ghana president, granted him a presidential commission as a Ghana naval officer with the rank of Commodore and appointed him Chief of Naval Staff. This was after the navy had been established in 1959.

After Nkrumah assumed the title of Supreme Commander in September, he replaced Commodore Forman with Lieutenant-Colonel Daniel Hansen. As Captain A. G. Forman he received a CBE in 1962.

References

Ghana Navy personnel
Royal Navy officers
1910 births
1967 deaths
Commanders of the Order of the British Empire
Chiefs of Naval Staff (Ghana)